SAMD or SaMD may refer to:

 SAM D, a family of ARM-based microcontroller products
 Software as a medical device (SaMD)